The 2019 Inter-District Championship (IDC) is the 34th season of Inter-District Championship. It is the last championship of the 2019 Fijian football season. The 2019 IDC started on 8 October and ii sponsored by Courts.

Teams 
Despite having 12 teams in 2019 Vodafone Senior League only 8 teams compete in 2019 IDC Senior Division. 2019 Vodafone Senior League had two groups of six teams each. The top five teams from Viti Levu Zone and the top three teams from Vanua Levu Zone play IDC Senior Division.

Group stage 
The 8 teams were split in two groups with four teams each.

Group A

Results

Group B

Results

Semi-finals

Final

Awards 

 Golden Boot - Jonas Nacewa (Nadroga)
 Golden Ball - Seveci Rokotakala (Navua)
 Fair Play Team - Navua
 New Find - Thomas Dunn (Navua)

 Day 1 MVP - Ravnit Chand (Lami)
 Day 2 MVP - Seveci Rokotakala (Navua)
 Day 3 MVP - Krishneel Dutt (Nadroga)

 Final MVP - Alfred Ali (Navua)

See also 
 2019 Vodafone Senior League
 2019 Fiji Premier League
 2019 Inter-District Championship
 2019 Fiji Battle of the Giants
 2019 Fiji Football Association Cup Tournament

References

External links

Fiji Inter-District Championship - Senior Division
2019 in Fijian football